Little House may refer to:

Arts and entertainment
The Little House, a 1942 children's picture book by Virginia Lee Burton
The Little House (film), a 2014 Japanese film
The Little House (novel), a 1996 novel by Philippa Gregory, adapted into a 2010 TV series
Little House on the Prairie (disambiguation), often referred to as simply "Little House", a series of novels and related works
"Little House", a song by the Fray from How to Save a Life, 2005
"Little House", a song by Amanda Seyfried from the soundtrack of the film Dear John, 2010

Places

United States

Little-Stabler House in Greenville, Alabama (listed on the National Register of Historic Places (NRHP) in Butler County, Alabama)
J.E. Little House in Conway, Arkansas (NRHP-listed)
Jim Little House in Bradford, Arkansas (NRHP-listed)
Ayers-Little Boarding House in Carnesville, Georgia (listed on the NRHP in Franklin County, Georgia)
Thomas K. Little House in Caldwell, Idaho (NRHP-listed)
Little Brick House in Vandalia, Illinois (NRHP-listed)
Little Loomhouses in or near Louisville, Kentucky (NRHP-listed)
Edward Little House in Auburn, Maine (NRHP-listed)
Spencer-Pierce-Little House in Newbury, Massachusetts (NRHP-listed)
Arthur D. Little Inc., Building in Cambridge, Massachusetts (NRHP-listed)
Ball Road-Little Salt Creek Bridge in Jasper Township, Michigan (NRHP-listed)
Alford-Little House in Georgetown, Mississippi (listed on the NRHP in Copiah County, Mississippi)
Dr. William Little House in Wesson, Mississippi (listed on the NRHP in Copiah County, Mississippi)
Russell M. Little House in Glens Falls, New York (NRHP-listed)
Little House (Palisades, New York) (NRHP-listed)
John Phillips Little House in Little's Mills, North Carolina (NRHP-listed)
Little Manor in Littleton, North Carolina (NRHP-listed)
W. J. Little House in Robersonville, North Carolina (NRHP-listed)
Boggan-Hammond House and Alexander Little Wing in Wadesboro, North Carolina (NRHP-listed)
Moses Little Tavern in Laboratory, Pennsylvania (NRHP-listed)
Martin-Little House in Phoenixville, Pennsylvania (NRHP-listed)
Doak-Little House in South Strabane Township, Pennsylvania (NRHP-listed)
Beaty-Little House in Conway, South Carolina (NRHP-listed)
Smith-Little-Mars House in Speedwell, Tennessee (NRHP-listed)
Little House (Victoria, Texas) (NRHP-listed)
Lake-Little House in Port Townsend, Washington (listed on the NRHP in Jefferson County, Washington)
Little House (Shepherdstown, West Virginia) in the Shepherdstown Historic District

Elsewhere
Little House, Meersburg, a historic house and museum in Meersburg, Germany
Royal Infirmary of Edinburgh, earlier known as Little House, in Edinburgh, Scotland, UK

See also
Little Sisters of the Poor Home for the Aged (disambiguation)